Countess Spencer may refer to:

 Georgiana Spencer, Countess Spencer (1737–1814), wife of John Spencer, 1st Earl Spencer
 Charlotte Spencer, Countess Spencer (1835–1903), wife of British Liberal politician Viscount Althorp
 Cynthia Spencer, Countess Spencer (1897–1972), paternal grandmother of Diana, Princess of Wales 
 Raine Spencer, Countess Spencer (1929–2016), stepmother of Lady Diana Frances Spencer
 Victoria Aitken (formerly Victoria, Countess Spencer; born 1965), sister-in-law of Diana, Princess of Wales
 Karen Spencer, Countess Spencer (born 1972), sister-in-law of Diana, Princess of Wales